Archibald John Primrose, 4th Earl of Rosebery,  (14 October 1783 – 4 March 1868), styled Viscount Primrose until 1814, was a British politician.

He was the eldest son of Neil Primrose, 3rd Earl of Rosebery and his second wife, Mary Vincent. Primrose was educated at Pembroke College, Cambridge, gaining his MA in 1804. He was Member of Parliament for Helston from 1805 to 1806 and Cashel from 1806 to 1807.

He succeeded to the earldom in 1814, and was created Baron Rosebery, of Rosebery in the County of Edinburgh, in the Peerage of the United Kingdom, in 1828. He was appointed a Privy Counsellor in 1831 and a Knight of the Thistle in 1840. He was a Fellow of the Royal Society.

He was the grandfather of Archibald Primrose, 5th Earl of Rosebery, who succeeded him to the title of Lord Primprose and briefly served as Prime Minister of the United Kingdom from 1894 to 1895.

Family
Lord Rosebery married firstly Harriett Bouverie, daughter of Hon. Bartholomew Bouverie  in 1808. They had four children:

Archibald John Primrose, Lord Dalmeny (1809–1851)
Lady Harriet Primrose (born 1810)
Lady Mary Anne Primrose (1812–1826)
Hon. Bouverie Francis Primrose  (1813–1898)

Lord and Lady Rosebery were divorced in 1815. He married secondly Anne Margaret Anson, daughter of Thomas Anson, 1st Viscount Anson in 1819. They had two children:

Lady Anne Primrose (22 Aug 1820 – 17 Sept 1862).
Lady Louisa Primrose (4 May 1822 – 23 Mar 1870).

References

External links 
 

1783 births
1868 deaths
Earls of Rosebery
Alumni of Pembroke College, Cambridge
Knights of the Thistle
Members of the Privy Council of the United Kingdom
Fellows of the Royal Society
Primrose, Archibald John Primrose, Viscount
Primrose, Archibald John Primrose, Viscount
Scottish representative peers
Politicians awarded knighthoods
Primrose, Archibald John Primrose, Viscount
Primrose, Archibald John Primrose, Viscount
UK MPs who inherited peerages
UK MPs who were granted peerages
Lord-Lieutenants of West Lothian
Primrose, Archibald John Primrose, Viscount
Primrose, Archibald John Primrose, Viscount
Peers of the United Kingdom created by George IV
Archibald